The 1951 William & Mary Indians football team represented William & Mary during the 1951 college football season. The season was notable for a scandal that involved former head coach Rube McCray tampering with football players' transcripts and credits to enable NCAA eligibility.''

Schedule

NFL Draft selections

References

William and Mary
William & Mary Tribe football seasons
William and Mary Indians football